Gestel en Blaarthem is a former municipality of the Netherlands. The municipality was made up of the villages of Gestel and Blaarthem. On 1 Januari 1920 the municipality merged with the municipality of Eindhoven, together with the former municipalities of Stratum, Strijp, Tongelre and Woensel.

Mayors of Gestel en Blaarthem

See also
Gestel

External links 
Map of Gestel en Blaarthem in 1867 on atlas1868.nl
Coat of arm of Gestel en Blaarthem, Hoge Raad van Adel

Former municipalities of North Brabant
History of Eindhoven